Edith Clara Summerskill, Baroness Summerskill,  (19 April 1901 – 4 February 1980) was a British physician, feminist, Labour politician and writer. She was appointed to the Privy Council in 1949.

Early life
Summerskill was educated at King's College London, and was admitted to medical school at Charing Cross Hospital Medical School, one of the earliest women to be admitted to medical school. She was one of the founders of the Socialist Health Association, which spearheaded the National Health Service (1948). She pressed for equal rights for women in the British Home Guard. In 1938, she was involved with  the Married Women's Association to promote equality in marriage. It was formed as a splinter group that was created with Juanita Frances as its first chair. Summerskill became its first president.

Parliament
Summerskill entered politics at 32 when she was asked to fight the Green Lanes ward in Harringay in the Middlesex County Council elections.  She then served as a councillor on Middlesex County Council from 1934 until 1941. She stood for a seat in the House of Commons unsuccessfully at the Putney byelection in 1934 and Bury at the 1935 general election, before becoming Labour Member of Parliament (MP) for Fulham West at a by-election in 1938 thanks to the working women's vote. She caused some disquiet by taking the seat in her maiden name. When the Fulham West constituency was abolished for the 1955 general election, she was returned to the House of Commons as MP for Warrington. She had a London flat in Ennismore Gardens.

Summerskill was included in Clement Attlee's Labour government following the election victory in 1945. She served as a Parliamentary Secretary in the Ministry of Food, and was later promoted to the Ministry of Social and National Insurance, heading the department she was profiled as the Minister of National Insurance, however she was not a cabinet minister.

As well as her service in government, Summerskill also served on the House of Commons Political Honours Scrutiny Committee from 1967 to 1976.

Summerskill served as Parliamentary Secretary to the Ministry of Food (1945–50) and as Minister of National Insurance (1950–51). She was a member of the Labour Party's National Executive Committee from 1944 to 1958 and served as Chair of the Labour Party 1954–5). She left the House of Commons in 1961 and was created a life peer as Baroness Summerskill, of Ken Wood in the County of London on 4 February 1961. Furthermore, she was awarded an additional honour being initiated into the Order of the Companions of Honour (CH) in 1966.

Summerskill appears in a specially selected list of Fabian Society members from 1942 to 1947, showing continuity and prestige. An active feminist, she was instrumental in promoting women's causes throughout that period, starting with the Clean Milk Act in 1949. Later, as the president of the Married Women's Association, she campaigned in and outside the parliament to assure the equal rights of housewives and of divorced women, which resulted in the Married Women's Properties Act in 1964 and the Matrimonial Homes Act in 1967.

Letters to My Daughter
During the 1950s, Summerskill wrote a series of letters to her daughter Shirley, who, like her mother, was an active feminist. Shirley studied medicine in Oxford at that time and later became a doctor and a Member of Parliament and of Cabinet. Edith Summerskill's letters to Shirley were collected and published in a book Letters to My Daughter (1957). Summerskill outlines her belief that women are superior to men in almost every way. In support of such a theory Summerskill presents three "facts": firstly, that only women can enjoy two worlds of creative enterprise, the biological and the intellectual. Secondly, she suggests women are physically stronger, live longer are constitutionally tougher, having greater stamina. Finally, she believes women have equal if not greater intellect than men.

Although Summerskill's book contains only Edith's letters to her daughter, the mother's response to questions raised by the daughter creates a sense of an ongoing dialogue between the two, concerning issues of education for women, equality and achievements. In reply to Shirley's question about the part that married women are playing in the affairs of the country, her mother writes:

The insistent demand of women for recognition in spheres of work outside the home, which has quietly but unremittingly been advanced in the course of the last hundred years, has grudgingly been conceded. As a doctor and a Member of Parliament I am fully conscious of the fact that the doors both of the medical schools and of the House of Commons had to be forced by furious and frustrated women before their claims were recognized. It would be quite inaccurate to suggest that we were welcomed into the universities or into public life. (143)
 
Summerskill constantly struggles for and raises consciousness about women's equal rights. In response to Shirley's complaint about "the stock question" of the anti-feminists, "Why have not more women achieved eminence in the arts and sciences?" She answers: "Personally I am astounded that so many have distinguished themselves despite the conditions which society has imposed upon them" (181). Summerskill maintains that in spite of the difficulties and prejudices, women are making progress and have achievements in music, visual art, and literature as well as some advancement in science and technology (181). Yet Summerskill's conclusion in 1956 is similar to the one Virginia Woolf reached twenty-five years earlier. Woolf writes that even when all the outward obstacles are overcome, she, or any other a woman, has not solved the problem of "my own experiences as a body" (1942: 206); Summerskill makes the parallel concession that for a woman, the "most powerful force, which takes her off the course" is the "biological urge to have a family" (187).

Personal life
Summerskill was married in 1925 to Dr Jeffrey Samuel. Their children took their mother's surname. Her daughter, Shirley Summerskill, also served as a physician, member of parliament and government minister. Her grandson Ben Summerskill became chief executive of the British gay equality charity Stonewall in 2003.

Publications
Babies without Tears (1941)
Wanted—babies: A trenchant examination of a grave national problem (1943)
Letters to my Daughter (1957)
The Ignoble Art (1957)
A Woman's World: Memoirs (1967)

References

External links

 
 
 
Edith Summerskill: Life Peer - UK Parliament Living Heritage
 Centre for Advancement of Women in Politics profile
 Catalogue of the Edith Summerskill papers held at LSE Archives

1901 births
1980 deaths
20th-century British women politicians
20th-century English medical doctors
Alumni of Charing Cross Medical School
Alumni of King's College London
British feminists
Chairs of the Labour Party (UK)
Councillors in Greater London
Female members of the Parliament of the United Kingdom for English constituencies
Labour Party (UK) MPs for English constituencies
Labour Party (UK) councillors
Labour Party (UK) life peers
Members of Middlesex County Council
Members of the Order of the Companions of Honour
Members of the Parliament of the United Kingdom for constituencies in Lancashire
Members of the Privy Council of the United Kingdom
Ministers in the Attlee governments, 1945–1951
National Council for Civil Liberties people
People from Harringay
British socialist feminists
UK MPs 1935–1945
UK MPs 1945–1950
UK MPs 1950–1951
UK MPs 1951–1955
UK MPs 1955–1959
UK MPs 1959–1964
UK MPs who were granted peerages
Women councillors in England
Life peeresses created by Elizabeth II